UFC 272: Covington vs. Masvidal was a mixed martial arts event produced by the Ultimate Fighting Championship that took place on March 5, 2022, at the T-Mobile Arena in Paradise, Nevada, part of the Las Vegas Metropolitan Area, United States.

Background
A UFC Featherweight Championship trilogy bout between current champion Alexander Volkanovski and former champion Max Holloway was originally expected to headline the event. The pairing first met at UFC 245, where Volkanovski defeated Holloway via unanimous decision to capture the title. Their second meeting took place at UFC 251, with Volkanovski successfully defending the title via split decision (a result which was met with controversy by fans, fellow fighters, and media outlets alike). However, two days after the trilogy announcement, Holloway withdrew due to an aggravated previous injury. He was replaced by former title challenger Chan Sung Jung and the bout was moved to UFC 273 on April 9.

A UFC Bantamweight Championship title unification rematch between current champion Aljamain Sterling and former champion/current interim title holder Petr Yan was expected to take place at this event. The pairing previously met at UFC 259, with Sterling winning the title by disqualification (intentional illegal knee strike) in the fourth round, becoming the first fighter to win a UFC title by disqualification. The rematch was initially expected to take place at UFC 267, however Sterling withdrew from the contest due to lingering neck issues and an interim title bout between Yan and Cory Sandhagen was set. The UFC then opted to move the pairing from this event to UFC 273.

After the postponement of the title fights, a welterweight bout between former interim UFC Welterweight Champion Colby Covington and former title challenger Jorge Masvidal headlined the event.

A heavyweight bout between Greg Hardy and Sergey Spivak was originally scheduled for UFC 270, but it was moved to this event after Hardy suffered a finger injury.

A five round lightweight bout between former UFC Lightweight Champion Rafael dos Anjos and Rafael Fiziev was originally scheduled to headline UFC Fight Night: Walker vs. Hill, but it was postponed to this event due to visa issues with Fiziev. However, Fiziev was forced to withdraw due to testing positive for COVID-19. He was replaced by Renato Moicano on just 4 days notice at a catchweight of 160 pounds.

A lightweight bout between Devonte Smith and Erick Gonzalez was scheduled for the event. However, Gonzalez was forced to withdraw from the event due to a foot injury. He was replaced by Ľudovít Klein.

Former UFC Women's Flyweight Championship challenger Jessica Eye was expected to face Manon Fiorot in a women's flyweight bout at the event. However, a week before the event, Eye withdrew due to injury and the bout was cancelled.

During the event's broadcast, former UFC Lightweight Champion Khabib Nurmagomedov was announced as the next "modern wing" UFC Hall of Fame inductee.

Results

Bonus awards 
The following fighters received $50,000 bonuses.
 Fight of the Night: Colby Covington vs. Jorge Masvidal
 Performance of the Night: Kevin Holland and Maryna Moroz

See also 

 List of UFC events
 List of current UFC fighters
 2022 in UFC

References 

Ultimate Fighting Championship events
2022 in mixed martial arts
March 2022 sports events in the United States
2022 in sports in Nevada
Mixed martial arts in Las Vegas
Sports competitions in Las Vegas
Events in Paradise, Nevada